Lexias aeropa, the orange-banded plane, is a butterfly in the family Nymphalidae. It is found in South-East Asia and Australia.

Females have a wingspan of about 85 mm, making them larger than males with a wingspan of about 6 mm. The adults are dark brown with a broad orange band across each wing. The underside is similar, but paler and rather mottled.

The larvae feed on Calophyllum species.

Subspecies
The following subspecies are recognised:
L. a. aeropa (southern Moluccas: Ambon, Ceram, Saparua)
L. a. angustifascia (Joicey & Noakes, 1915) (Biak, Yapen Islands)
L. a. choirilus (Fruhstorfer, 1913) (Waigeu)
L. a. eporidorix (Fruhstorfer, 1913) (northern Moluccas: Bachan, Halmahera, Morotai)
L. a. eutychius (Fruhstorfer, 1913) (Aru, Kai, West Irian to Papua, Karkar Island, Cape York)
L. a. hegias (Fruhstorfer, 1913) (Bismarck Archipelago: New Britain, New Ireland)
L. a. helvidius (Fruhstorfer, 1913) (Buru)
L. a. orestias (Fruhstorfer, 1913) (Sula Islands: Taliabu, Mangoly, possibly Sanana)
L. a. paisandrus (Fruhstorfer, 1913) (Moluccas: Obi)

References

Lexias
Butterflies described in 1758
Taxa named by Carl Linnaeus